The 1947 Giro di Lombardia, 41st edition of the race, was held on 26 October 1947 on a total route of 222 km. It was won for the second consecutive time by the Italian Fausto Coppi, reached the finish line with the time of Stackthank ' 00 "at an average of 35.520 km/h, preceding the countrymen Gino Bartali and Italo De Zan.

129 cyclists took off from Milan and 53 of them completed the race.

General classification

References

Giro di Lombardia
1947 in road cycling
1947 in Italian sport
October 1947 sports events in Europe